= Chandgiri =

Village in Maharashtra, India

Coordinates: 19°24′N 83°03′E

Chandgiri is a village in the Nashik District, Maharashtra, India.
